Bifurcation or bifurcated may refer to:

Science and technology
 Bifurcation theory, the study of sudden changes in dynamical systems
 Bifurcation, of an incompressible flow, modeled by squeeze mapping the fluid flow
 River bifurcation, the forking of a river into its tributaries
 Bifurcation lake, a lake that flows into two different drainage basins
 Bifurcated bonding, a single hydrogen atom participates in two hydrogen bonds

Other uses
 Bifurcation (law), the division of issues in a trial

See also
 Aortic bifurcation, the point at which the abdominal aorta bifurcates into the left and right common iliac arteries
 Tracheal bifurcation, or the carina of trachea (Latin: bifurcatio tracheae)
 Bifurcation diagram
 Bifurcate merging, a kinship system
 False dilemma or bifurcation
 Tongue bifurcation (disambiguation)
 Fork (disambiguation)